Raputia aromatica is a species of tree and is a member of the Rutaceae family.

The species can be found in countries such as Brazil and Venezuela.

References 

Zanthoxyloideae
Trees of Brazil
Trees of Venezuela